Katerinino is a rural locality (a village) in Zaborskoye Rural Settlement, Tarnogsky District, Vologda Oblast, Russia. The population was 39 as of 2002.

Geography 
Katerinino is located 25 km west of Tarnogsky Gorodok (the district's administrative centre) by road. Boyarskaya is the nearest rural locality.

References 

Rural localities in Tarnogsky District